

Persian culture and history
 Persian architecture
 Persian art
 Persian Bayán
 Persian calendar
 Persian Canadians
 Persian carpet
 Persian Christians
 Persian column
 Persian Corridor
 Persian Cossack Brigade
 Persian cuisine
 Persian dance
 Persian deities
 Persian embroidery
 Persian Empire
 Persian handicrafts
 Persian Jewels
 Persian Jews
 Persian garden
 Persian Gendarmerie
 Persian grammar
 Persian Gulf Service Command
 Persian Hat
 Persian appel dessert
 Persian Constitutional Revolution
 Persian Kings
 Persian language
 Persian language in the Indian subcontinent
 Persian Letters
 Persian literature
 Persian weights and measures
 Persian media
 Persian miniature
 Persian motifs
 Persian music
 Persian mythology
 Persian names
 Persian pickles
 Persian studies
 Persian New Year (Norouz)
 Persian religions
 Persian Sibyl
 Persian tilework
 Persian weave
 Persian weblogs
 Persian women
 The Persian Encyclopedia
 Persian Immortals (ancient military unit)
 Persianate cultures.
 Persianism
 Arsames of Persia
 Anglo-Persian Oil Company
 Persid languages
 Parsee
 Persian Expedition (disambiguation)
 The Persians
 Turco-Persian
 Hamamni Persian Baths
 History of Persia
 Dari-Persian
 Tajiki-Persian
 Tat Persian
 Old Persian
 The announcement of the Academy of Persian Language and Literature
 Middle Persian
 Persian Shia Cemetery, Saint Petersburg
 Encyclopaedia of Persian Language and Literature
 Academy of Persian Language and Literature
 Magus
 South Persia Rifles
 Cultural Heritage Organization of Iran
 Golha Radio Program
 Khatam, a Persian style of marquetry

Plants and animals named after Persia
 Persian barrenwort
 Persian buttercup
 Persian cat
 Persian bells
 Persian blue allium
 Persian berry
 Persian cornflower
 Persian crocodile
 Persian cumin
 Persian cucumber
 Persian cyclamen
 Persian darnel
 Persian epimedium
 Persian fallow deer
 Persian fire
 Persian fritillaria
 Persian fritillary
 Persian Greyhound
 Persian hogweed (Heracleum persicum)
 Persian horse conch
 Persian iris
 Persian ivy
 Persian jasmin
 'Persian Jewels'
 Persian jird
 Persian lamb
 Persian leopard
 Persian lime
 Persian lynx
 Persian melon
 Persian mole
 Persian nepeta
 Persian nitro clover
 Persian onion
 Persian parrotia
 'Persian Pearl'
 Persian pellitory
 Persian pine
 Persian princess (a sort of rose flower)
 Persian ratsnake
 Persian rose
 Persian ryegrass (Lolium persicum)
 Persian sheep
 Persian shield
 Persian silk tree
 Persian speedwell
 Persian stonecress
 Persian tiger
 Persian trident bat
 Persian walnut
 Persian whites
 Persian wildrye
 Persian yellow
 Persian yellow rose
 Persian zatar
 Persian saffron
 Persian zafron

Places named after Persia
 Persian Gulf
 Persia, Iowa, United States
 Persia, New York, United States
 Persian Creek, California, United States
 Persia, California, United States
 Persis (Fars Province)
 Persepolis
 Persian dream

Wars that are termed "Persian"
 Greco-Persian Wars
 Roman–Persian Wars
 Russo-Persian Wars
 Russo-Persian War (1651-1653)
 Russo-Persian War (1722–23)
 Russo-Persian War (1796)
 Russo-Persian War (1804–13)
 Russo-Persian War (1826–28)
 Turko-Persian Wars
 Anglo-Persian War
 Persian Gulf Wars
 Iran–Iraq War (1980–88), also known as the Persian Gulf War or the First Gulf War
 Gulf War (1991), also known as the Persian Gulf War, the First Gulf War, Operation Granby, or Operation Desert Storm
 Iraq War (2003–present), also known as the Second or Third Gulf War; an ongoing conflict

Colours called Persian
 Persian blue
 Persian burgundy (dark auburn)
 Persian green
 Persian red
 Persian rose
 Persian sunset
 Persian violet
 Persian yellow
 Persian orange
 Persian indigo
 Medium Persian blue
 Persian pink

Other uses of the term Persian
 Persian March
 Persian nectar
 Persian tobacco
 Persian powder
 Persian drill
 Persian Gulf illness
 Persian wheel
 Persian waxing
 Prince of Persia video game
 Persiana Jones
 "Pink Pearl of Persia", the first episode of animated series Batfink.

Lists
 List of kings of Persia
 List of English words of Persian origin
 List of Persians
 List of ancient Persians
 List of Persian language authors
 List of Persian language poets
 List of Persian language television channels
 List of Persian War Victoria Cross recipients
 List of Persian painters
 List of French loanwords in Persian

See also: List of Iran-related topics, Aryans.

Iran-related lists
Lists of topics